Rezaabad-e Taheri (also Romanized as Reẕāābād-e Ţāherī; also known as Reẕāābād) is a village in Chenaran Rural District, in the Central District of Chenaran County, Razavi Khorasan Province, Iran. At the 2006 census, its population was 228, in 56 families.

References 

Populated places in Chenaran County